Julie Ward is the name of:

 Julie Ward (judge), Australian judge
 Julie Ward (politician) (born 1957), British politician
 See Killing of Julie Ward for Julie Ward, wildlife photographer murdered in 1988